Satire is a television and film genre in the fictional or pseudo-fictional category that employs satirical techniques, be it of a political, religious, or social variety. Works using satire are often seen as controversial or taboo in nature, with topics such as race, class, system, violence, sex, war, and politics, criticizing or commenting on them, typically under the disguise of other genres including, but not limited to, comedies, dramas, parodies, fantasies and/or science fiction.

Satire may or may not use humor or other, non-humorous forms as an artistic vehicle to illuminate, explore, and critique social conditions, systems of power ("social, political, military, medical or academic institutions"), hypocrisy, and other instances of human behavior.

Examples

Film

À Nous la Liberté, 1931
The Trial, 1962
Dr. Strangelove, 1964
Wild in the Streets, 1968
Mr. Freedom, 1969
Joe, 1970
The Discreet Charm of the Bourgeoisie, 1972
Death Race 2000, 1975
Network, 1976
Dawn of the Dead, 1978
The Atomic Cafe, 1982
Videodrome, 1983
Brazil, 1985
Heathers, 1988
They Live, 1988
Pump Up the Volume, 1990
Barton Fink, 1991
Man Bites Dog, 1992
Bullets Over Broadway, 1994
Starship Troopers, 1997
The Truman Show, 1998
American Beauty, 1999
Fight Club, 1999
South Park: Bigger, Longer & Uncut, 1999
Bamboozled, 2000
Chicago, 2002
Thank You for Smoking, 2005
Idiocracy, 2006
Don't Look Up, 2021
Triangle of Sadness, 2022

Series
UK

Yes, Minister (1980–1984)
Yes, Prime Minister (1986–1988)
The Day Today (1994)
Brass Eye (1997, 2001)
The Thick Of It (2005-2012)
Black Mirror (2011–), such as
"Fifteen Million Merits" 
"The Waldo Moment" 
"Nosedive" 

USA

The Richard Pryor Show (1977)
Mary Hartman, Mary Hartman (1978)
Married . . . with Children (1987–1997) 
Mystery Science Theater 3000 (1988-1999)
Tanner '88 (1988, mini-series)
The Simpsons (1989–), such as
"The Front" 
"The Itchy & Scratchy & Poochie Show" 
South Park (1997–), such as 
"Jewbilee" 
"Red Hot Catholic Love"  
"The Death Camp of Tolerance" 
"I'm a Little Bit Country," 
"Christian Rock Hard"  
"Goobacks"  
"Stupid Spoiled Whore Video Playset"  
"Best Friends Forever"   
"Trapped in the Closet" 
"Smug Alert!"  
"Go God Go XII"  
"With Apologies to Jesse Jackson"  
"Britney's New Look" 
"The Tale of Scrotie McBoogerballs" 
"Taming Strange" 
 Family Guy (1999–)
 Reno 911! (2003–)
 Masters of Horror, episode "Homecoming" 
 The Sarah Silverman Program, episode "Face Wars"  
The Boondocks (2005–2014)
 Better Off Ted (2009–2010)
 Community (2009–2015)
 The Amazing World of Gumball (2011–2019)
 Rick and Morty (2013–)

Japan

Key the Metal Idol (1994–1997)
Paranoia Agent (2004)
Ouran High School Host Club (2006)

Backlash and censorship
Film director Jonathan Lynn generally advises against marketing one's work as "satire" because according to Lynn it "can substantially reduce viewing figures and box office" due to a presumed negative perception of satire in the [American] industry: 

Film, more than television, offers advantages for satire, such as the "possibility of achieving the proper balance" between realism and non-realism, using the latter to communicate about the former. The ideal climate for a satirical film involves "fairly free" political conditions and/or independent producers with "modest" financial backing.

 United States In the case of American satire, Roger Rosenblatt postulated that post-9/11 political climate "caused irony's  death." Satire has been subjected to official and unofficial pressures concluding in self-censorship or outright removal of the material, with the reason given of satire not being economically viable. In the case of television, controversial content creators have been historically constrained by  Federal Communications Commission regulations (Gray et al., p. 181), which threatens them with sanctions for airing alleged "indecent material" but also by industry and corporate watchdogs. Since the 1930s, with notable example being the Hays Office, there have  always been organizations that "watch[ed] closely over media content to ensure it doesn't threaten the commercial climate in general and their products in particular." Typical pressures put on American satire that present topics of (anti-)war, patriotism, sex, religion, ethnicity, and race.

In another view, censorship and content sanitization cannot eliminate satire. Production of political satire between 1929 and 1960 was scarce but uninterrupted. Pro-government comic relief satire devoid of criticism was one strain of satire found on radio and television during the 1940s and 1950s that was "mass audience-oriented,  nonradical," and focused on "[safe] plot lines [of] middle-class, suburban, white characters" typified by 1950s sitcoms, such as I Love Lucy, while the so-called edgier strain was rediscovered in the burgeoning stand-up comic scene in the late 1950s and forward. The latter was typified by comedy music albums of Tom Lehrer, standup comedy of Lenny Bruce, MAD magazine, and Chicago improvisational comedy troupe Second City. 
 Lebanon The 1978 film Alexandria . . . Why? by Egyptian filmmaker Youssef Chahine was banned in Lebanon and other Arab countries for satirical references of the 1952 Egyptian revolution.
 Russia Satirical films about "life in Russia during the Stalin era" were banned. In the 1990s, Russian television show producers were charged with "tax evasion and illegal currency dealings" after airing an episode showing a critical caricature of Boris Yeltsin but those charges were dropped after television network president condemned this action.
 Georgia The 1987 art film Repentance, initially banned in Russia and Russia-controlled Eastern Europe, only shown in Georgia before being internationally released in 1987 with permission of by-then head of state Mikhail Gorbachev, contained satirical allusions to Stalin. Academician Dmitry Likhachov considered the film "significant" for society as a whole: "The past does not die. It is necessary to publish in journals of mass circulation works which were not published in the past. The main theme in literature now is repentance." Other Georgian films that were banned include My Grandmother (revived 1976), an art film with surreal and satirical elements, and Saba, a satirical drama by Mikheil Chiaureli.

References and notes